Oldřich Dvořák (born 22 December 1953) is a Czech wrestler. He competed in the men's Greco-Roman 100 kg at the 1980 Summer Olympics.

References

External links
 

1953 births
Living people
Czech male sport wrestlers
Olympic wrestlers of Czechoslovakia
Wrestlers at the 1980 Summer Olympics
People from Duchcov
Sportspeople from the Ústí nad Labem Region